Yal Boland (also Romanized as Yāl Boland; also known as Qal‘eh Sangī and Qārā Darreh) is a village in Cham Kuh Rural District, Bagh-e Bahadoran District, Lenjan County, Isfahan Province, Iran. At the 2006 census, its population was 104, in 22 families.

References 

Populated places in Lenjan County